Harmony Cemetery is a historic cemetery located near Marlowe, Berkeley County, West Virginia. It is an interdenominational burial ground established about 1830.  It includes a number of notable grave markers and is the site of the old Harmony Meeting House.

It was listed on the National Register of Historic Places in 1991.

References

External links
 

Cemeteries on the National Register of Historic Places in West Virginia
National Register of Historic Places in Berkeley County, West Virginia
1830 establishments in Virginia